Werder (Havel) (official name derived from Werder an der Havel ("Werder upon Havel"), colloquially just Werder) is a town in the state of Brandenburg, Germany, located on the Havel river in the Potsdam-Mittelmark district, west of the state's capital Potsdam.

Werder has a long and rich history and is a nationally recognized Erholungsort – a government designation given to regions of Germany that have been recognized and must be continuously re-certified as having air and climate qualities which provide a healthful environment to visitors. Werder is also famous for hosting one of Germany's three largest festivals, the Baumblütenfest, held annually in May.

Etymology
The Werder municipal area stretches along the banks of the Havel, a tributary of the Elbe, and the town's oldest quarter is located on an island in the river. Hence the name, as the landscape term Werder (like Wörth in Upper German) means "river island".

History
The city "Werdere" is mentioned in 1317, "Wehrder" in 1450 and in its present spelling in 1580. However, in its southwest end pieces of ancient broken glass have been discovered, and on its south end are remains of what may have been an Early Medieval Slavic castle wall.

The coin-shaped city island in the Havel river is mentioned as being accessible via a bridge in a 1317 deed, when the ministeriales of the Brandenburg margraves had to sell the estates to the monks of nearby Lehnin Abbey. The town was devastated by Swedish troops during the Thirty Years' War.

During World War II and prior thereto an airfield existed in the north of the city which, together with an adjacent park, was used during the war as an airplane pilot training area. Werder was the base of Luftwaffe general Karl Koller during the Battle of Berlin. After the end of the war, Soviet troops were stationed in this area of the city. The last Russian troops departed in 1993, three years after the reunification of Germany.

Demography

Politics
Since 1990, Werder's mayor has been Werner Große of the  Christian Democratic Union (CDU), who had previously functioned as the city's deputy.  The 29-seat town council (SVV), meets every two months, to represent the interests of the citizenry.  The council is composed of 17 CDU members, 4 Social Democratic Party members, 3 Action Free Citizens members and various other unaffiliated city delegates.

There are a number of committees with appointed citizens delegates who consult with the town council. The central committee, which exists under chairmanship of the mayor, deals with finances in consultation with an auditing board of examiners. The committee for social policy, education, culture and sport, oversees area schools. There is also a special committee responsible for town development, construction and living conditions, which has significant influence over the city's infrastructure.

Economics
Although at one time known for its wine production and fishing industry, both pursuits declined during the 18th century. From early times, the monks of the Cistercian monastery of Lehnin cultivated fruit in the region, and Werder is still particularly well known for this endeavor, which is also the foundation for its famous blossoming season festival. The predominant fruits grown in the area are cherries, apples, and strawberries but raspberries, gooseberries, currants, blackberries, apricots, peaches, pears, and plums are also cultivated. Vegetables are also grown, especially tomatoes, the bulk of which are cultivated in local greenhouses.

Viticulture

Wine cultivation is the city's second-oldest trade after fishing, brought to this area before 1300 by monks of the Cistercian Order. The wine of the Margraviate of Brandenburg (Mark Brandenburg) was by the end of the 13th century one the region's most important exports to eastern and northern Europe. The Hohenzollern dynasty that came from Franconia to Brandenburg, made the wine of the Brandenburg Mark part of its court. Until the death of the Great Elector, the wine was drunk in his residence. The first Wine Master Order of Brandenburg was founded in 1598 by the Elector Johann Georg, and at that time it was reported that Havel would also have vineyards just like the ones in the Moselle. However, the viticulture in this area was not trouble-free. The winters could be extremely hard on occasion, when many vines would get frostbite. This happened in the winter of 1739/40, when the frost lasted until June. In the first half of the 18th century, grapes were grown on more than 100 hectares in Werder. The vines at that time were Weißer Elbling, Weißer and Roter Schönedel, and Rotfranke grapes. Nevertheless, more red wine than white wine was grown. The Werderaner Wachtelberg (Quail's Mountain) is the oldest winegrowing location beyond the island of Werder. On the island, vineyards were located on the Muhlenberg hill. The vineyards existed before their envelopment by fruit trees, especially apricots and peaches. The fruits were transported with great care in the Obsttienen (small wooden transport containers). 

In 1887 it was reported that 2 vineyards remained. Wine cultivation ended when the last vines in Werder were frostbitten in the winter of 1955/56. In 1985 the Fruit Production Cooperative of Werder was founded on the Werderaner Wachtelberg, with a vineyard covering 4.8 hectares. Today about 30,000 vines grow there on nearly 7 hectares of land. Dornfelder, Regent, Saphira, and Müller-Thurgau grapes are grown here, among other varieties. Within the scope of the Federal Garden Show (Bundesgartenschau) in Potsdam, Wine Teaching Paths were established at the Werderaner Wachtelberg. Today 38 red and 40 white wine varieties are grown here. The Werderaner Wachtelberg vineyard lies at a latitude of 52 degrees and 22 minutes north, far to the north of the typical winegrowing areas in Europe. In 1991 the vineyard was given Großlagenfreie Einzellage classification in the Weinanbaugebiet Saale-Unstrut (winegrowing area on the Saale and Unstrut rivers) and was also recognised by the EU. It is at the most northern registered position for quality-tested wine cultivation (QbA) in Europe and the world.

Notable people
 Anna Simson (1835–1916), women's rights activist
 Karl Hagemeister (1848–1933), landscape painter
 Burglinde Pollak (* 1951), pentathlete
 Brigitte Ahrenholz (1952–2018), rower
 Adolf Damaschke (1865–1935), politician and economist, lived in Werder since 1907
 Bruno Kramm (* 1967), musician

Gallery

International relations

Twin towns — Sister cities
Werder is twinned with:
 Oppenheim, Rhineland-Palatinate, Germany
 Almdorf, Schleswig-Holstein, Germany
 Hjørring, Denmark
 Tczew, Poland
 Biržai, Lithuania
 Muan-gun, South Korea

See also
Großer Plessower See

References

 Werder, in: Meyers Konversationslexikon, 4. Aufl. 1888-89, Bd. 16, S. 534.
Werder News at the Werder (Havel) Blog.
Thomas's Glassware Tour 2006. Werder/Havel. Retrieved April 3, 2006.
Werder upon Havel City Council 2006.City Council of Werder upon Havel's official website. Retrieved April 3, 2006.

External links

 Official website of Werder (Havel)  + 

Localities in Potsdam-Mittelmark